FC Peremoha Dnipro is a professional Ukrainian football club from the city of Dnipro. The team is currently playing Ukrainian Second League after competing in the Ukrainian Amateur championship.

History

The team was founded in 2017. It is named after one of neighborhoods in Dnipro. "Peremoha" debuted in the Ukrainian Second League in the 2020–21 season.

Former names
 2017–2018 Don Giros Dnipro
 2018– Peremoha Dnipro

Players

League and cup history

{|class="wikitable"
|-bgcolor="#efefef"
! Season
! Div.
! Pos.
! Pl.
! W
! D
! L
! GS
! GA
! P
!Domestic Cup
!colspan=2|Europe
!Notes
|-bgcolor=SteelBlue
|align=center|2018–19
|align=center|4th
|align=center|6
|align=center|22
|align=center|7
|align=center|8
|align=center|7
|align=center|28
|align=center|28
|align=center|29
|align=center|
|align=center|
|align=center|
|align=center|
|-bgcolor=SteelBlue
|align=center|2019–20
|align=center|4th
|align=center|7
|align=center|18
|align=center|3
|align=center|2
|align=center|13
|align=center|9
|align=center|42
|align=center|11
|align=center|
|align=center|
|align=center|
|align=center bgcolor=lightgreen|Promoted
|-bgcolor=PowderBlue
|align=center|2020–21
|align=center|3rd
|align=center|
|align=center|	
|align=center|	 	
|align=center|		
|align=center|
|align=center|	 	 	
|align=center|	
|align=center|
|align=center|
|align=center|
|align=center|
|align=center|
|}

Managers
 2017–2018 Femis Sahirov
 2018–2020 Hennadiy Zhylkin
 2020 Yevhen Fetysov
 2020 Yevhen Yarovenko
 2020–2021 Pavlo Taran
 2021 Dmytro Ryaboy
 2021– Serhiy Vorobey

References

External links
 Profile  at AAFU

 
Ukrainian Second League clubs
Football clubs in Dnipro
2017 establishments in Ukraine
Association football clubs established in 2017